Juan Ignacio González Errázuriz is the Roman Catholic bishop of San Bernardo, Chile. He is a member of the Prelature of Opus Dei.

References

External links

21st-century Roman Catholic bishops in Chile
Opus Dei members
Living people
1956 births
Roman Catholic bishops of San Bernardo